Highland Secondary School was a high school in Dundas, Ontario that opened in 1966. The school was a member of the Hamilton-Wentworth District School Board, in Ward 13. Highland was originally conceived to be 25% Academic and 75% Vocational, but evolved into a fully comprehensive secondary school. Only 60% of Highland Secondary School students who graduated pursued post-secondary education, making Highland one of the lowest in the board. Highland Secondary was renamed Dundas Valley Secondary in June 2014, when nearby Parkside Secondary closed.

Technological programs
Highland Secondary School offered five specialized technological programs that gave interested students training in a specific field of interest.  The program fields were: Transportation, Construction, Precision Machining, Electronic Design, Communication – specialties in cabinet making, pneumatics, aviation.

Program highlights
Highland Secondary School took part in the following programs:
 Variety of courses including: LDCC, Applied, Academic, Open, College, Workplace, University
 Award-winning arts program: Music, Art, Drama
 Yearbook – 2 credit course
 Student Success team of teachers to guide, mentor, and track all students
 Individual timetabling for students considered to be at risk
 Study Hall at lunch for Grade 9 and 10s
 In-class OSSLT preparation
 S.T.E.P. (Summer Transitions program for Grade 8 – 9)
 Caring Adult program

Clubs and activities
Highland Secondary School offered the following clubs and activities:
 Jr. Concert Band, Concert Band, Symphonic Band, Sr. Jazz Band
 Badminton
 Curling
 Basketball
 Alpine Skiing and Snowboarding Teams
 Track and Field
 Baseball
 Golf
 Cross-Country
 Soccer
 Tennis
 Touch Football
 Volleyball
 Football (male)
 Waterpolo
 Hockey
 Indoor Track
 Councils (Student, Grad, Music, Visual Arts, Boys’ Athletics, Girls’ Athletics)
 HAVEN (social justice) / WAC (World Awareness)
 Highland Writers' Guild / Drama Student Federation
 Leadership Camp / DECA
 Feel the Power, Feel the Fit (Girls’ Fitness)
 Library / Chess / Model Building / Philosophy/ Sound & Light / Anime
 Knitting
 Cancer Awareness
 Friends of Diversity
 Dance Team
 GLOW
 Roseberry's Board Games Club

See also
List of high schools in Ontario

References

High schools in Hamilton, Ontario
Educational institutions established in 1966
Educational institutions disestablished in 2014
1966 establishments in Ontario
2014 disestablishments in Ontario
Dundas, Ontario